Mohamed El Badraoui  (born 27 June 1971, in Beni Mellal) is a Moroccan retired professional football striker who played for several clubs in Turkey and the Morocco national football team.

El Badraoui played for Erzurumspor, Bursaspor and Adanaspor in the Turkish Süper Lig. He also played for Espérance Sportive de Tunis during its 1997 CAF Cup championship.

He made two appearances with the Morocco national football team at the 1992 Summer Olympics. El Badraoui played several matches for the national team, including participation in the 2000 African Cup of Nations.

References

External links

1971 births
Living people
Moroccan footballers
Moroccan expatriate footballers
Morocco international footballers
Süper Lig players
Espérance Sportive de Tunis players
Erzurumspor footballers
Bursaspor footballers
Adanaspor footballers
Expatriate footballers in Tunisia
Expatriate footballers in Turkey
Footballers at the 1992 Summer Olympics
Olympic footballers of Morocco
2000 African Cup of Nations players
People from Beni Mellal
Association football forwards
Moroccan expatriate sportspeople in Tunisia
Moroccan expatriate sportspeople in Turkey